Iraqi Jews in Israel, also known as the Bavlim (Hebrew for "Babylonians"), are immigrants and descendants of the immigrants of the Iraqi Jewish communities, who now reside within the state of Israel. They number around 450,000.

History

Since the destruction of the First Temple there was a connection between Babylonian exiles and the Land of Israel. According to the Al-Yahudu Tablets, a collection of tablets from the sixth century BCE, multiple Jews were given names reflecting their families desire to return to Zion.

Zionism during the Ottoman Empire
By the end of the 19th century, political Zionism entered the consciousness of the Jews of Iraq and Zionist activity began.

In 1914, the first Zionist organisation was founded by Menashe Hakim, Maurice Fattal and Raphael Horesh under the name "Zionist Association of Baghdad", to promote the Zionist cause in Mesopotamia. The short-lived organisation collapsed in November of that year when the Ottoman Empire declared war on Britain.

Zionism during the British Mandate
In the 1920s, after Britain conquered Iraq from the Ottoman Empire, transportation between Iraq and Palestine became much more common. Although at this point Iraqi Zionists were mostly unorganized, they were well funded by a few wealthy philanthropists. In 1920, the first major Zionist organization was founded under the name "Jewish Literacy Society." It published a Hebrew and Judeo-Arabic journal called Yeshurun. On March 5, 1921, a branch of the Jewish Literary Society founded a separate Zionist association known as "The Mesopotamian Zionist Society." A revived "Zionist Association of Baghdad" would later merge with this Society in 1924. 

In contrast to the elite class of Iraqi Jews who remained unattracted to Zionism, it received considerable support from poorer Jewish citizens who demonstrated their support in multiple public gatherings. These demonstrations led to condemnations by British officials and Arab authorities who warned against public activities. Until 1929, there was no official ban against their activities and Zionist organizations continued to exist discreetly. In 1923, a branch of Keren Hayesod was established in Baghdad. Reuben Battat, an Iraqi-Jewish judge, handed a decision down in favor of allowing a property transfer from Jewish philanthropist Gourji Shemtov to the Keren Hayesod in 1923. This decision was used against him 26 years later, when he was sentenced to three years in prison on charges of being a Zionist.

Alfred Mond's 1928 visit to Baghdad led to the first anti-Zionist demonstration in the city. Multiple Jews were injured in attacks related to the protests. There were other short lived Zionist organizations such as "Agudat Ahi'ever" (1929), "Histadrut ha-No-ar ha-Ivri" (1929), and "Maccabi" (1929–1930). Palestinian Jewish teachers were brought in to teach Hebrew and Jewish history. Some AIU schools in Baghdad during this time organized Hebrew literary societies which promoted Zionism.

After the 1929 riots, the Iraqi government began a campaign against Zionism. Palestinian Jewish teachers were expelled, and Iraqi Zionist leaders were arrested.

The Farhud pogrom of 1941

During the 1930s, Nazi influence was widespread in Baghdad, due to presence by the German legation as well as Arabic broadcasts from Berlin. Adolf Hitler's Mein Kampf was translated into Arabic by Yunis al-Sabawi and published in local Baghdadi newspapers. Following a military coup in 1941, a pro-Nazi government gained power in Iraq. One day after an armistice between Iraq and Britain, began a two-day pogrom.

Days before the pogrom broke out, members of the Al-Muthanna Club went around marking Jewish homes with red paint. The massacre began on the Jewish holiday of Shavuot, and throughout the rampage hundreds of Jews were murdered, thousands were wounded, while thousands of Jewish shops and synagogues were plundered. It was estimated by Iraqi-Jewish leaders that around 2,500 families, which accounts for 15% of Baghdadi Jews, suffered directly as a result of the pogrom. Some of the leaders behind the Farhud pogrom blamed Jews for British imperialism in Iraq while others perceived Baghdadi Jews as Zionists or Zionist sympathizers.

The effect the Farhud had on the Iraqi Jewish community was tremendous. It added a sense of anxiety among Baghdadi Jews which heavily influenced their relationship with Iraq. It shed a light on the plight of Jews in Arab countries, leading to Iraqi Jews being included in Zionist plans for immigration to establish a Jewish state.

Exodus of Iraqi Jews (1949–1952)

Following the 1947 Partition Plan for Palestine and Israeli independence in 1948, a wave of anti-Semitism hit Iraq. All Jews working in the government were removed from their positions, hundreds were arrested on dubious charges of being Zionists or Communists. On October 23, 1948, wealthy Jewish businessman Shafiq Ades, who was an outspoken Anti-Zionist, was publicly hanged in Basra after being accused of selling weapons to Israel and the Iraqi Communist Party. No evidence was provided during the three-day trial showing Ades sold weapons to Israel and the judge presiding over the case was a member of a pro-Nazi party. The general sentiment among Iraqi Jews following his killing was that if Ades could be executed by the state, any Jew could. After the establishment of Israel in 1948, Iraq forbade Jews from emigrating to Israel. Even with the restrictions, the Iraqi Zionist underground was smuggling around 1,000 Jews every month to Israel via Iran.

On May 19, 1950, 150 Jews were airlifted out of Iraq. At first it was called "Operation Ali Baba," however it became known by Operation Ezra and Nehemiah, for the prophets who led Babylonian Jews out of exile to the Land of Israel. Within days of the first operation, over 30,000 Iraqi Jews registered to leave which meant they had to leave within 15 days. The ones who weren't able to leave within 15 days were considered stateless refugees, and many lived homeless in the streets of Baghdad. In response, the Iraqi government announced that it was prepared to move them to concentration camps if they were not removed swiftly.

From 1950–1952 between 120,000 and 130,000 Jews were airlifted out of Iraq to Israel. Once the operation was over, only 6,000 Jews remained in Iraq.

Notable people

 Eli Amir
 Shoshana Arbeli-Almozlino
 Binyamin Ben-Eliezer
 Itamar Ben-Gvir
 Anat Berko
 Arieh Elias
 Shlomo Eliahu
 Inbal Gavrieli
 Brian George
 May Golan
 Samuel Hayek
 Shlomo Hillel
 Dalia Itzik
 Yitzhak Kaduri
 Moshe Levi
 Ayelet Shaked
 Eli Yatzpan
 Zvi Yehezkeli
 Ovadia Yosef

See also 
Jewish ethnic divisions
Indian Jews in Israel
History of the Jews in Iraq
Iranian Jews in Israel
Kurdish Jews in Israel
Iraq–Israel relations

Languages:
Baghdad Jewish Arabic
Barzani Jewish Neo-Aramaic
Judeo-Iraqi Arabic

References 

 

 
Israeli Jews by national origin
 
Iraq–Israel relations